{{Speciesbox
| image =
| status = CR
| status_system = IUCN3.1
| status_ref = 
| taxon = Scardinius scardafa
| display_parents = 3
| authority = (Bonaparte, 1837)
| synonyms = *Rutilus heegeri Agassiz, 1835 Leuciscus scarpata Bonaparte, 1837 Leuciscus scardafa Bonaparte, 1837 Leuciscus marrochius Costa, 1838 Leuciscus heegeri Bonaparte, 1839 Leuciscus scarpetta Valenciennes, 1844 Heegerius typus Bonaparte, 1845 
}}Scardinius scardafa'' is a species of ray-finned fish in the family Cyprinidae.
It is found only in Italy.
Its natural habitats are rivers and freshwater lakes.

References

Scardinius
Endemic fauna of Italy
Fish described in 1837
Taxa named by Charles Lucien Bonaparte
Taxonomy articles created by Polbot